Boons Camp is an unincorporated community in Johnson County, Kentucky, United States. The community is named after a camp used by Daniel Boone during the 1790s while he was hunting with the settlers from nearby Blockhouse Bottom. The community's original post office opened on May 16, 1876, with James Mollett as its postmaster.

References

Unincorporated communities in Johnson County, Kentucky
Unincorporated communities in Kentucky